responDesign, Inc (now RespondWell) is software development company that focused on "Games That Are Good For You." It was founded in 2003 by Ted Spooner, Phineas Barnes and Daryn Chapman in Portland Oregon around Phineas's idea to create a virtual personal trainer for video game consoles. The result was Yourself!Fitness a game/program that guided users through a series of workouts to better their health. In 2006, the company made a deal with McDonald's to distribute four of its "Yourself|Fitness" titles with the restaurant chain's healthy meals for a period of four weeks.

In October 2016, RespondWell was acquired by Zimmer Biomet Holdings for an undisclosed amount.

Legal
In 2004, responDesign inc. was sued, along with Microsoft, by writer Roger Avary. The suit centered on the alleged use of one of Avery's ideas, Virtual Yoga, for a game created in partnership by responDesign and Microsoft. Chief Executive of the company, Ted Spooner, claimed this allegation was bogus.

See also
Exergaming
Yourself!Fitness
Serious games

References

External links
 Official responDesign website

Defunct software companies of the United States